Rolf Andersen may refer to:

 Rolf Andersen (diplomat) (1897–1980), Norwegian diplomat
 Rolf Andersen (politician) (1916–1990), Norwegian Labour Party politician
 Rolf Andersen (rower) (born 1945), Danish Olympic rower
  (1920–2016), Norwegian conductor
 Rolf Trolle Andersen (born 1945), Norwegian diplomat
 Rolf Erling Andersen (1947–2021), Norwegian politician